Southern Cross Auckland Surgical Centre is a private day-stay hospital in Remuera, Auckland, New Zealand. It is run by the Southern Cross group. It was established as a private hospital in 1987 (New Zealand's first facility purpose-built for such a use) and was taken over by Southern Cross in 2005.

It has 4 operating theatres, two recovery rooms and a 10-bed overnight stay facility. It employs around 90 staff and services 6,000 patients a year. Several specialists also have consultation rooms at the centre.

References

External links

Buildings and structures in Auckland
Auckland Surgical Centre
Hospitals established in  1987
1987 establishments in New Zealand